Survive the Night  (formerly titled The Long Night) is a 2020 American action thriller film directed by Matt Eskandari and starring Bruce Willis, Chad Michael Murray, and Shea Buckner. The film was released in the United States on May 22, 2020.

Plot
Two criminals Jamie and Matthias are involved in the attempted robbery of a garage which goes wrong, Jamie on a spur of the moment attempted to rob the garage and the owner fought back. Jamie shoots a hostage and Matthias gets shot in the leg. They escape but Matthias needs medical attention. A disgraced physician (Chad Michael Murray) is taken hostage along with his family after the two criminals break in the house and demand he remove a bullet from one of the criminal's legs.

However, the physician's father Frank (Bruce Willis) finds that his wife had been killed. Rich successfully removes the bullet, but Frank sees the opportunity and suddenly picks up the scalpel and cuts Jamie, Jamie then grabs a large kitchen knife and stabs Frank who escapes into the night. Rich threatens to cut Matthias artery with a scalpel, but Jamie shoots him in the shoulder. Matthias is completely incapacitated as Rich hasn't closed the wound, and has only stemmed the blood flow using surgical clamps. In the meantime, Frank has returned to the house to his dead wife, and looking through the window he sees his wounded son. They meet in the garage where Rich instructs Frank on dealing with his gunshot wound. Jamie and Matthias are considering their options.

In the morning Jamie decides to go and find the family and kill them. Jan and Riley are together in an outbuilding. Frank and Rich decide to fight back, Rich stuns Jamie in the Garage, and Frank lures Jamie away from the house in the car. Jamie subsequently returns to the house to look for the others. Rich and Jan meet up, but Jamie attacks Rich from behind and knocks him out. When he wakes up he is back in the house, where Jamie forces Rich to complete the operation. Matthias dies during the operation. Meanwhile Frank returns to the house and sets Jan free. Jamie threatens to shoot Rich but Jan stops him, she shoots, misses and runs out of the house with Jamie chasing after her, Rich grabs a gun and follows him and fatally shoots him. The family all reunite on the front porch.

Cast
Bruce Willis as Frank Clark
Chad Michael Murray as Rich Clark
Shea Buckner as Jamie Granger
Tyler Jon Olson as Matthias Granger
Lydia Hull as Jan Clark
Riley Wolfe Rach as Riley Clark
Jessica Abrams as Rachel Clark
Sara Lynn Holbrook as Woman in Store
Jef Holbrook as Clerk

Production
Principal photography took only ten days and was in Columbus, Georgia.

Box office
As of August 27, 2022, Survive the Night grossed $220,371 in the United Arab Emirates, Portugal, and Vietnam.

Reception
On Metacritic the film has a weighted average score of 26 out of 100, based on four critics, indicating "generally unfavorable reviews".

Accolades

References

External links
 
 

2020 films
American action thriller films
Films directed by Matt Eskandari
Films shot in Georgia (U.S. state)
Home invasions in film
2020 action thriller films
2020s English-language films
2020 independent films
2020s American films